Zambia first competed at the Summer Deaflympics in 2013. The country also competed at the 2017 Summer Deaflympics held in Samsun, Turkey.

The country sent a delegation of three athletes to both events. In 2013 the country competed in events in athletics. In 2017 the country competed in badminton and cycling.

The country has not yet competed at the Winter Deaflympics.

Medal tallies

Summer Deaflympics

References 

Nations at the Deaflympics
D
Deaf culture in Zambia